Noah Ryan Gray (born April 30, 1999) is an American football tight end for the Kansas City Chiefs of the National Football League (NFL). He played college football at Duke and was drafted by the Chiefs in the fifth round of the 2021 NFL Draft.

Early years
Gray grew up in Gardner, Massachusetts and attended Leominster High School. He played wide receiver as a freshman before becoming the team's starting quarterback the next season. He completed 101 of 179 passes for 1,707 yards and 21 touchdowns in his junior season. As a senior, Gray moved back to wide receiver and was named first-team All-State after catching 30 passes for 619 yards and eight touchdowns. Gray committed to play college football at Duke over offers from Temple and Appalachian State.

College career
Gray recorded five receptions for 37 yards and two touchdowns as a freshman. He played in all 13 of Duke's games and had 20 receptions for 234 yards and one touchdown in his sophomore season. As a junior, Gray had 51 receptions for 392 yards and three touchdowns and was named second-team All-ACC and a second-team All-American by The Walter Camp Football Foundation. Gray entered his senior year on the watchlist for the Mackey Award and as one of the top tight end prospects for the 2021 NFL Draft.

Gray was diagnosed as a type 1 diabetic during college.

Professional career

Gray was drafted by the Kansas City Chiefs in the fifth round, 162nd overall, of the 2021 NFL Draft. He signed his four-year rookie contract on May 13, 2021. He scored his first career NFL touchdown against the Las Vegas Raiders in Week 10, on Sunday Night Football. He appeared in all 16 games, of which he started one, as a rookie. He finished with seven receptions for 36 receiving yards and a touchdown.

In the 2022 season, Gray appeared in all 17 games, of which he started eight. He finished with 28 receptions for 299 receiving yards and one receiving touchdown. Gray became a Super Bowl champion when the Chiefs beat the Philadelphia Eagles in Super Bowl LVII. He had one reception for six yards in the game.

References

External links

Kansas City Chiefs bio
Duke Blue Devils bio

Living people
American football tight ends
Duke Blue Devils football players
Players of American football from Massachusetts
People from Leominster, Massachusetts
Sportspeople from Worcester County, Massachusetts
Kansas City Chiefs players
1999 births